Leslie Beach is a resort village in the Canadian province of Saskatchewan within Census Division No. 10. It is on the shores of Fishing Lake in the Rural Municipality of Foam Lake No. 276.

History 
Leslie Beach incorporated as a resort village on July 1, 1999.

Demographics 

Government 
The Resort Village of Leslie Beach is governed by an elected municipal council and an appointed administrator that meets on the third Tuesday of every month. The mayor is Roger Nupdal  and its administrator is Brenda Kipling.

See also 
List of communities in Saskatchewan
List of municipalities in Saskatchewan
List of resort villages in Saskatchewan
List of villages in Saskatchewan
List of summer villages in Alberta

References

External links 

Resort villages in Saskatchewan
Foam Lake No. 276, Saskatchewan
Division No. 10, Saskatchewan